net.art refers to a group of artists who have worked in the medium of Internet art since 1994. Some of the early adopters and main members of this movement include Vuk Ćosić, Jodi.org, Alexei Shulgin, Olia Lialina, Heath Bunting, Daniel García Andújar, and Rachel Baker. Although this group was formed as a parody of avant garde movements by writers such as Tilman Baumgärtel, Josephine Bosma, Hans Dieter Huber and Pit Schultz, their individual works have little in common.

The term "net.art" is also used as a synonym for net art or Internet art and covers a much wider range of artistic practices. In this wider definition, net.art means art that uses the Internet as its medium and that cannot be experienced in any other way. Typically net.art has the Internet and the specific socio-culture that it spawned as its subject matter but this is not required.

The German critic Tilman Baumgärtel - building on the ideas of American critic Clement Greenberg - has frequently argued for a "media specificity" of net.art in his writings. According to the introduction to his book "net.art. Materialien zur Netzkunst", the specific qualities of net.art are "connectivity, global reach, multimediality, immateriality, interactivity and egality".

History of the net.art movement 

The net.art movement arose in the context of the wider development of Internet art. As such, net.art is more of a movement and a critical and political landmark in Internet art history, than a specific genre. Early precursors of the net.art movement include the international fluxus (Nam June Paik) and avant-pop (Mark Amerika) movements. The avant-pop movement particularly became widely recognized in Internet circles from 1993, largely via the popular Alt-X site.

In 1995, the term "net.art" was used by nettime initiator Pit Schultz as a title for an exhibition in Berlin in 1995, in which Vuk Cosic and Alexei Shulgin both showed their work. It was later used with regard to the "net.art per se" meeting of artists and theorists in Trieste in May 1996, and referred to a group of artists who worked together closely in the first half of the 1990s. These meetings gave birth to the website net.art per se, a fake CNN website "commemorating" the event. The term "net.art" has been wrongly attributed to artist Vuk Cosic in 1997, after Alexei Shulgin wrote about the origin of the term in a prank mail to the nettime mailinglist. According to Shulgin's mail net.art stemmed from "conjoined phrases in an email bungled by a technical glitch (a morass of alphanumeric junk, its only legible term 'net.art')".

Online social networks 
net.artists have built digital art communities through an active practice of web hosting and web art curating. net.artists have defined themselves through an international and networked mode of communication, an interplay of exchanges, collaborative and cooperative work . They have a large presence on several mailing lists such as Rhizome, File festival, Electronic Language International Festival, Nettime, Syndicate and Eyebeam. The identity of the net.artists is defined by both their digital works and their critical involvement in the digital art community,  as the polemical discussion led by Olia Lialina that occurred on Nettime in early 2006 on the "New Media" Wikipedia entry shows

net.artists like Jodi developed a particular form of e-mail art, or spam mail art, through text reprocessing and ASCII art. The term "spam art" was coined by net critique and net art practitioner Frederic Madre to describe all such forms of disruptive interventions in mailing-lists, where seemingly nonsensical texts were generated by simple scripts, online forms or typed by hand.

A connection can be made to the e-mail interventions of "Codeworks" artists such as Mez or mi ga or robots like Mailia which analyze emails and reply to them. "Codeworks" is a term coined by poet Alan Sondheim to define the textual experiments of artists playing with faux-code and non-executable script or mark-up languages.

Tactical media net art 
net.art developed in a context of cultural crisis in Eastern Europe in the beginning of the 1990s after the end of the Soviet Union and the fall of the Berlin Wall. The artists involved in net.art experiments are associated with the idea of a "social responsibility" that would answer the idea of democracy as a modern capitalist myth. The Internet, often promoted as the democratic tool par excellence, but largely participating in the rules of vested interests, is targeted by the net.artists who claimed that "a space where you can buy is a space where you can steal, but also where you can distribute". net.artists focus on finding new ways of sharing public space.

By questioning structures such as the navigation window and challenging their functionality, net.artists have shown that what is considered to be natural by most Internet users is actually highly constructed, even controlled, by corporations. Company browsers like Netscape Navigator or Internet Explorer display user-friendly structures (the "navigation", the "exploration" are landmarks of social practices) to provide the user with a familiar environment; net.artists try to break this familiarity. Olia Lialina, in My Boyfriend Came Back From The War or the duo Jodi, with their series of pop-up interventions and browser crashing applets, have engaged the materiality of navigation in their work. Their experiments have given birth to what could be called "browser art", which has been expanded by the British collective I/O/D's experimental navigator WebStalker.

Alexei Shulgin and Heath Bunting have played with the structure of advertisement portals by establishing lists of keywords unlikely to be searched for but nonetheless existing on the web as URLs or metadata components: they use this relational data to enmesh paths of navigation in order to create new readable texts . The user is not exploring one art website that has its own meaning and aesthetic significance within itself, but rather they are exposed to the entire network as a collection of socioeconomic forces and political stances that are not always visible.

Rachel Greene has associated net.art with tactical media as a form of Detournement. Greene writes: "The subversion of corporate websites shares a blurry border with hacking and agitprop practices that would become an important field of net art, often referred to as 'tactical media'."

Hacker culture 
The Jodi collective works with the aesthetics of computer errors, which has a lot in common, on both the aesthetic and pragmatic levels, with hacker culture. Questioning and disturbing the browsing experience with hacks, code tricks, faux-code, and faux-virus, critically investigates the context in which they are agents. In turn, the digital environment becomes concerned with its own internal structure. The collective 0100101110101101.org expands the idea of "art hacktivism" by performing code interventions and perturbations in art festivals such as the Venice Biennale. On the other hand, the collective irational.org expands the idea of "art hacktivism" by performing interventions and perturbations in the real world, acting on it as on a possible ground for social reengineering.

"We can point to a superficial difference between most net.art and hacking: hackers have an obsession with getting inside other computer systems and having an agency there, whereas the 404 errors in the JTDDS (for example) only engage other systems in an intentionally wrong manner in order to store a 'secret' message in their error logs. It's nice to think of artists as hackers who endeavour to get inside cultural systems and make them do things they were never intended to do: artists as culture hackers.".

A networking expert hacked into DNS servers to have the traceroute Linux command reveal the history of star wars IV. This deep technical repurposing for the sake of enchantment and fun can be considered as a net.art performance.

Computer worms can be intentionally good and positive when they are repurposed for large-scale ephemeral art that uses the whole Internet as a canvas.

Critique of the art world 

During the heyday of net.art developments, particularly during the rise of global dot.com capitalism, the first series of critical columns appeared in German and English in the online publication Telepolis. Edited by writer and artist Armin Medosch, the work published at Telepolis featured American artist and net theorist Mark Amerika's "Amerika Online" columns. These columns satirized the way self-effacing net.artists (himself included) took themselves too seriously. In response, European net.artists impersonated Amerika in faux emails to deconstruct his demystification of the marketing schemes most net.artists employed to achieve art world legitimacy. It was suggested that "the duplicitous dispatches were meant to raise US awareness of electronic artists in Europe, and may even contain an element of jealousy."

Many of these net.art interventions also tackled the issue of art as business and investigated mainstream cultural institutions such as the Tate Modern. Harwood,  a member of the Mongrel collective, in his work Uncomfortable Proximity (the first on-line project commissioned by Tate) mirrors the Tate's own website, and offers new images and ideas, collaged from his own experiences, his readings of Tate works, and publicity materials that inform his interest in the Tate website.

net.artists have actively participated in the debate over the definition of net.art within the context of the art market. net.art promoted the modernist idea of the work of art as a process, as opposed to a conception of art as object making .  Alexander R. Galloway, in an e-flux article entitled "Jodi's Infrastructure" argues that Jodi's approach to net.art, which involves the very structures that govern coding,  is uniquely modernist: the form and content converge in the artwork.   The presentation of this process within the art world—whether it should be sold in the market, or shown in the institutional art environment, is problematic for digital works  created for the Internet. The web, as marketable as it is, cannot be restricted to the ideological dimensions of the legitimate field of art, the institution of legitimation for art value, that is both ideological and economical . All for Sale by Aliona is an early net.art experiment addressing such issues. The WWWArt Award competition initiated by Alexei Shulgin in 1995 suggests rewarding found Internet works with what he calls an "art feeling."

Some projects, such as Joachim Schmid's Archiv, Hybrids, or Copies by Eva & Franco Mattes (under the pseudonym of 0100101110101101.org), are examples of how to store art-related or documentary data on a website. Cloning, plagiarizing, and collective creation are provided as alternative answers, such as in the Refresh Project.

Olia Lialina has addressed the issue of digital curating via her web platform Teleportacia.org, an online gallery to promote and sell net.art works. Each piece of net.art has its originality protected by a guarantee constituted by its URL, which acts as a barrier against reproducibility and/or forgery. Lialina claimed that this allowed the buyer of the piece to own it as they wished: controlling the location address as a means of controlling access to the piece. This attempt at giving net.art an economic identity and a legitimation within the art world was questioned even within the net.art sphere, though the project was often understood as a satire. On the other hand, Teo Spiller really sold a web art project Megatronix to Ljubljana Municipal Museum in May 1999, calling the whole project of selling the net.art.trade.

Teleportacia.org became an ambiguous experiment on the notion of originality in the age of extreme digital reproduction and remix culture. The guarantee of originality protected by the URL was quickly challenged by Eva & Franco Mattes, who, under the pseudonym of 0100101110101101.org, cloned the content and produced an unauthorized mirror-site, showing the net.art works in the same context and the same quality as the original. The Last Real Net Art Museum is another example of Olia Lialina's attempt to deal with the issue.

Online social networks experiments, such as the Poietic Generator, which existed before the net.art movement, was involved in it, and still exist after it, may show that the fashion scheme of net.art may have forgotten some deep theoretical questions.

See also 
 Digital culture
 History of the Internet
 Internet art
Glitch art
 Net-poetry
 Surfing club

References

Bibliography
 Baranski Sandrine, La musique en réseau, une musique de la complexité ?, Éditions universitaires européennes, 2010 La musique en réseau
 Bosma, Josephine,  Nettitudes Let's Talk Net Art, Nai010 publishers, Rotterdam, 2011, 
  Martín Prada, Juan, Prácticas artísticas e Internet en la época de las redes sociales, Editorial AKAL, Madrid, 2012,

External links
 Thomas Dreher: History of Computer Art, chap. VI.3 Net Art in the Web Munich 2014
 Thomas Dreher: IASLonline Lessons in NetArt.

Internet culture
Net.artists
Art websites
Multimedia
New media art